The men's C-2 500 metres competition in canoeing at the 2008 Summer Olympics will take place at the Shunyi Olympic Rowing-Canoeing Park in Beijing.  The C-2 event is raced in two-man sprint canoes. This would be the last time the event would take place at the Summer Olympics. On 13 August 2009, it was announced by the International Canoe Federation that the men's 500 m events would be replaced by 200 m events at the 2012 Summer Olympics with one of them being K-1 200 m for the women. The other events for men at 200 m will be C-1, C-2, and K-1.

Competition consists of three rounds: the heats, the semifinals, and the final. All boats compete in the heats. The top finisher in each of the three heats advances directly to the final, while the next six finishers (places 2 through 7) in each heat move on to the semifinals. The top three finishers in each of the two semifinals join the heats winners in the final.

Heats took place on August 19, semifinal on August 21, and final on August 23.

Schedule
All times are China Standard Time (UTC+8)

Medalists

Results

Heats
Qualification Rules: 1..3->Final, 4..7->Semifinal + 8th best time, Rest Out

Heat 1

Heat 2

Semifinal
Qualification Rules: 1..3->Final, Rest Out

Final

The Chinese duo repeated their gold from 2004 and had to be fished out of the water after when Meng Guanliang dived into the water right when crossing the finish line, causing the canoe to capsize.

References

Sports-reference.com 2008 C-2 500 m results.
Yahoo! August 19, 2008 sprint heat results. – accessed August 19, 2008.
Yahoo! August 21, 2008 sprint semifinal results. – accessed August 21, 2008.
Yahoo! August 23, 2008 sprint final results. – accessed August 23, 2008.
YouTube.com of the Olympic final. – accessed 13 August 2009 (Commentary in German).

Men's C-2 500
Men's events at the 2008 Summer Olympics